"Go Crazy" is a song by American rapper Young Jeezy, released as the third single from his debut album Let's Get It: Thug Motivation 101. The song was written by Jeezy and produced by Don Cannon. The CD single was released on August 30, 2005. It samples the song "(Man, Oh Man) I Want To Go Back"  by Curtis Mayfield. The single was released through The Island Def Jam Music Group and Young Jeezy's Corporate Thugz Entertainment

Pitchfork Media listed it as the 359th best song of the 2000s.

Background
The instrumental was first used by rapper T.I. for a freestyle on his mixtape, Down With The King. Jeezy ended up using the beat for his album. After, an extended version of the album version leaked online featuring Jeezy's original 3 verses, in addition to new verses by Jay-Z and Fat Joe. The official single version used Jay-Z's verse from the extended version that leaked earlier, with the first and third verse from Jeezy's original album version. It is rumored Fat Joe was removed due to the tensions between himself and Jay-Z. Later pressings of Jeezy's album replaced the original album version of the song with the single version.

Chart positions

References

2005 singles
Jeezy songs
Songs written by Jeezy
Gangsta rap songs
Song recordings produced by Don Cannon
Songs written by Don Cannon
2005 songs